Magdi Abdelghani Sayed Ahmed (born 27 July 1959) is an Egyptian retired professional footballer who played as an attacking midfielder.

Playing career
Abdelghani won 50 caps for Egypt, and at the 1990 FIFA World Cup in Italy he scored a penalty against Netherlands.

He also competed at the 1984 Summer Olympics, and helped the Pharaohs win the 1986 African Cup of Nations on home soil. He also won an All-African Games gold medal in 1987.

References

External links

1959 births
Living people
Footballers from Cairo
Egyptian footballers
Association football midfielders
Al Ahly SC players
Al Mokawloon Al Arab SC players
Al Masry SC players
Primeira Liga players
S.C. Beira-Mar players
Egypt international footballers
1990 FIFA World Cup players
Footballers at the 1984 Summer Olympics
Olympic footballers of Egypt
1984 African Cup of Nations players
1986 African Cup of Nations players
1992 African Cup of Nations players
Egyptian expatriate footballers
Expatriate footballers in Portugal
Egyptian expatriate sportspeople in Portugal
Egyptian Premier League players
African Games gold medalists for Egypt
African Games medalists in football
Africa Cup of Nations-winning players
Competitors at the 1987 All-Africa Games